Arnold Vosloo is a South African and American  actor. He is famous for roles such as Imhotep in The Mummy and The Mummy Returns, Colonel Coetzee in Blood Diamond, Pik van Cleef in Hard Target, Dr. Peyton Westlake in Darkman II and Darkman III, Zartan in G.I. Joe: The Rise of Cobra and its sequel, sniper Jacob Broadsky in the TV series Bones and Islamic terrorist Habib Marwan in the fourth season of 24.

Early life
An Afrikaner of Dutch and German ancestry, Vosloo was born into a Pretoria acting family, his parents having been stage-actors. His father ran a drive-in theater in Alberton, Gauteng. He has one sister. After high school and military service (from which he received a medical discharge), he took drama courses at the Technikon Pretoria.

Career
Vosloo began his acting career in the South African theatre where he won several Dalro Awards for his performances in such plays as Don Juan, Hamlet, and Môre is 'n Lang Dag (Tomorrow is a Long Day) and he quickly became a regular at Pretoria's State Theatre. He also starred in Torch Song Trilogy and won another award for the TV show, Meisie van Suid-Wes (Girl from South West).

In 1984, he moved on to film where he continued Dalro Award-winning performances in films such as Boetie gaan Border toe (Boetie goes to the border, a comedy about the Border War) acting alongside fellow South African actor Frank Opperman, and Circles in a Forest (based on the book Kringe in 'n Bos by author Dalene Matthee) in 1990. Vosloo also starred in the "Boetie" sequel, Boetie op maneuvers (Boetie on maneuvers) in 1986. Next was the German three-parter Morenga (1985), Saturday Night at the Palace (based on the play by Paul Slabolepszy about racism in South Africa), Skeleton Coast (1987) and The Rutanga Tapes (1990). 

Upon arriving in the U.S., Vosloo returned to the theatre where he appeared in Born in the R.S.A. at Chicago's Northlight Theatre and in the NY's Circle in the Square Uptown's short-lived production of Salomé (1992) together with Al Pacino.

His American film debut was in Gor (1987). He later appeared in the two less successful sequels to the 1990 film Darkman, Darkman II: The Return of Durant (1994) and Darkman III: Die Darkman Die (1996), filling the shoes of Liam Neeson as the titular character Darkman. 

Vosloo is also known for portraying villains such as in the John Woo film Hard Target (1993), starring Jean-Claude Van Damme, and the titular role of the 1999 film The Mummy (starring Brendan Fraser), as well as its 2001 sequel, The Mummy Returns. In both films he played Imhotep, an ancient Egyptian high priest. Vosloo also played François Molay, the main villain's henchman, in the 2003 film Agent Cody Banks.

In 2004, The Revenge of the Mummy: The Ride opened in both Universal Studios theme parks in Orlando and Hollywood. Vosloo and Fraser were there at both openings to promote the new rides, in which both of them star, as well as featuring a life size image of Vosloo as The Mummy.

Alongside his film career, he guest-starred in several TV series, including The Red Shoe Diaries, American Gothic (1995), Nash Bridges (1995), Charmed (2000), Alias (2004) and NCIS (2009). He was one of the main characters in Veritas: The Quest (2003). He also had a major role in the fourth season of 24 (2005), as terrorist leader Habib Marwan. Vosloo appeared in three episodes of Chuck in 2009 as Fulcrum agent Vincent.

In 2004, Vosloo returned to South Africa to make Forgiveness, about an ex-policeman who seeks out the family of the anti-Apartheid activist that he killed. He played mercenary Colonel Coetzee in the 2006 film Blood Diamond, which was partially filmed in South Africa. 

Vosloo has been involved in video games: His likeness, as well as his voice, was chosen for main hero (Saul Myers) of video game Boiling Point: Road to Hell, published in summer of 2005 by ATARI. 

Vosloo portrayed the Cobra mercenary and master of disguise, Zartan, in the summer 2009 release G.I. Joe: The Rise of Cobra, reprising this villainous role in the 2013 release G.I. Joe: Retaliation.

Personal life
In 1988, Vosloo became a naturalized United States citizen after marrying his Act of Piracy and Skeleton Coast co-star Nancy Mulford; they divorced three years later. On 16 October 1998, he married Southern California native Silvia Ahí, a Mexican-American marketing director. Vosloo and Ahí are spokespersons for the International Fund for Animal Welfare, IFAW.

In an interview with Charlie Rose, Vosloo noted he looked similar to American actor Billy Zane. According to Vosloo, when people came asking him if he was "the guy in Titanic," he would reply, "Of course, of course," as a joke.

Filmography

Film

Television

Video games

References

External links

 
 
 
 

20th-century American male actors
20th-century South African male actors
21st-century American male actors
21st-century South African male actors
Afrikaner people
American male film actors
American male stage actors
American male television actors
American people of Afrikaner descent
Living people
People from Pretoria
South African emigrants to the United States
South African male film actors
South African male stage actors
South African male television actors
South African people of Dutch descent
South African people of German descent
Naturalized citizens of the United States
Year of birth missing (living people)